Stefano Allocchio (born 18 March 1962) is an Italian former professional racing cyclist. He rode in two editions of the Tour de France, nine editions of the Giro d'Italia and one edition of the Vuelta a España. He also competed in the points race event at the 1984 Summer Olympics.

Major results
1985
 Giro d'Italia
1st Stages 8a & 11 
 1st Stage 1 Settimana Internazionale di Coppi e Bartali
1988
 1st Stage 2 Giro di Puglia
 2nd Trofeo Laigueglia
1989
 1st Stage 8 Vuelta a España
 1st Stage 1 (ITT) Tirreno–Adriatico
 1st Stage 1 Settimana Internazionale di Coppi e Bartali
1990
 Giro d'Italia
1st Stages 4a & 8 
1993
 2nd Giro della Provincia di Reggio Calabria

Grand Tour general classification results timeline

References

External links
 

1962 births
Living people
Italian male cyclists
Cyclists from Milan
Olympic cyclists of Italy
Cyclists at the 1984 Summer Olympics
20th-century Italian people